Martin Walsh (born 16 January 1966) was a Scottish footballer who played for Dumbarton and Stirling Albion.

References

1966 births
Scottish footballers
Dumbarton F.C. players
Stirling Albion F.C. players
Scottish Football League players
Living people
Sportspeople from Dumbarton
Footballers from West Dunbartonshire
Association football forwards